Homer Comes Home is a 1920 American silent comedy film directed by Jerome Storm and written by Alexander Hull and Agnes Christine Johnston. The film stars Charles Ray, Otto Hoffman, Priscilla Bonner, Ralph McCullough, Walter Higby, John Elliott, and Harry Hyde.

Plot 
Homer Cavender is regarded as a failure by the people in his hometown, because he has been fired from just about every job.

The only person sorry to see him go is Rachel Prouty, daughter of one of the town's leading citizens. He goes to work as a clerk for Bailly and Kort.

Two years after he started working, Homer finds he is not progressing rapidly enough. He has an idea of creating a factory in his hometown. But the venture requires money to get off the ground. His bosses refuses to finance the venture. However, Homer has managed to save $300. With his cash, he returns home on the Lightning Express, which carries only important people.

The whole town turns out to see him return, sporting his new suit. Homer takes the best room at a local hotel. He hires the local taxi for two weeks. He spends money recklessly. He wants to propose to Rachel, but is afraid to let her know he really has no money. Then he secures the capital to carry out his venture by offering the citizens stock in the enterprise. But Arthur Machim, a jealous rival of Homer's finds out that he is only a clerk, and spreads the news that Homer is dishonest. When Homer fails to appear at work after receiving the financial backing, it appears to everyone that Machim is correct.

Then Homer's venture comes to pass, and he is named the boss of his factory. In so doing, he also wins the hand of Rachel.

Production
The film was released on June 27, 1920, by Paramount Pictures.

Crew
Direction : Jerome Storm
Producer : Thomas H. Ince
Screenplay : Alexander Hull, Agnes Christine Johnston
Cinematography : Chester A. Lyons (as Chester Lyons)
Film Editing : Harry L. Decker
Art Direction : W.L. Heywood
Art Department : Leo H. Braun, Carl Schneider, F.J. Van Halle
Supervisor : Thomas H. Ince
Technical director : Harvey C. Leavitt

Cast
Charles Ray as Homer Cavender
Otto Hoffman as Silas Prouty 
Priscilla Bonner as Rachel Prouty
Ralph McCullough as Arthur Machim
Walter Higby as Old Machim
John Elliott as Mr. Bailly
Harry Hyde as Mr. Kort
Gus Leonard as The Grocer
Joseph Hazelton as The Shoe Store Man 
Bert Woodruff as Farmer Higgins
Louis Morrison as Old Tracey

Posterity
A copy of the film exists in a collection or archive.

References

External links 
 

1920 films
1920s English-language films
Silent American comedy films
1920 comedy films
Paramount Pictures films
Films directed by Jerome Storm
American black-and-white films
American silent feature films
1920s American films